Izsófalva (formerly Disznóshorvát) is a village in Borsod-Abaúj-Zemplén County in northeastern Hungary. The village has a population of 1,871.

References

External links

  in Hungarian

Populated places in Borsod-Abaúj-Zemplén County